C. R. Makepeace & Company, established in 1889, was a nationally active firm of mill architects based in Providence, Rhode Island. It was dissolved in 1944.

Charles R. Makepeace
Founder Charles R. Makepeace was born in Fayetteville, North Carolina on May 20, 1860. He attended Duke University, then known as Trinity College, but left without graduating in 1880. He then worked on a number of cotton mills in Randolph County, before eventually making his way to Rhode Island. He first practiced as a member of D. M. Thompson & Company in Providence. When David M. Thompson left the partnership to manage mills for B. B. & R. Knight, Makepeace formed a new partnership, Hall & Makepeace, with established architect Clifton A. Hall. This lasted from 1884 to 1886. Hall was prominent as both a designer of industrial buildings as well as those that normally made up an architect's practice. 

In 1886 Makepeace left, and opened his own office. He established C. R. Makepeace & Company in 1889. Circa 1892 he made his designer, Charles A. M. Praray, a partner. He added new associates when Praray left in 1898. Makepeace's son, the MIT-trained C. Salisbury Makepeace, joined the office in 1916, upon graduating. Makepeace was an active member of Central Congregational Church in Providence. Makepeace was a member of the Providence common council from the second ward from 1904 to 1910.

Later history
After Makepeace's death in 1926, the company was presumably managed by C. Salisbury Makepeace. Henry A. McClean purchased the firm in 1928, and managed it until 1944, when it was dissolved. McClean died in West Warwick in 1950. C. Salisbury Makepeace died in August 1949.

Charles A. M. Praray
Charles Praray first emerges as the chief designer and construction engineer of the Makepeace firm, and was made a partner circa 1892. As designer, in 1894, he patented what was known as "Praray's Improved Construction", a system of mill construction which separated the structure of the roof and floors of a mill from that of the walls, allowing much more daylight to enter the building. Visually, Praray's design may be most noted for its unusual window patterns, which emerge from the brick piers in a zig-zag pattern. Only five these mills have been documented as being built, but Chas. A. M. Praray & Company touted it in advertisements for many years. Prior to its demolition around 2014, the Selma Cotton Mill of 1896 in Alabama was the best-preserved example of Praray's mill design. The only surviving example with walls intact is one of the Holt mills in Haw River, North Carolina.

Praray has also been identified as the designer of Makepeace & Co.'s Petersburg Silk Mills in Scranton, Pennsylvania, designed in 1897. He prepared "several sets" of designs, one of which was likely to be a Praray's Improved Construction design. However, this was rejected in favor of a conventional design.

In 1898 Praray left to establish his own office, Chas. A. M. Praray & Company, with William Whittam, Jr. The firm had two offices, one at Providence, and one at Charlotte, North Carolina, managed by Whittam. The partnership existed until about 1909. Praray then took his son, Charles W. Praray, into partnership, as C. A. M. Praray & Son. He died in 1910.

Projects

Charles R. Makepeace, 1886-1889

C. R. Makepeace & Company, 1889-1944

Gallery

References

Architecture firms based in Rhode Island
Design companies established in 1889
Design companies disestablished in 1944
Companies based in Providence, Rhode Island
Industrial design firms
1889 establishments in Rhode Island
1944 disestablishments in Rhode Island